The harlequin antbird (Rhegmatorhina berlepschi) is a species of bird in the family Thamnophilidae. It is endemic to Brazil.

Its natural habitat is subtropical or tropical moist lowland forests.

This species is a specialist ant-follower that depends on swarms of army ants to flush insects and other arthropods out of the leaf litter.

References

harlequin antbird
Birds of the Brazilian Amazon
Endemic birds of Brazil
harlequin antbird
harlequin antbird
Taxonomy articles created by Polbot